Westone is a brand of musical instruments that has been used by various manufacturers of electric and acoustic guitars and basses. The name gained wide recognition in the mid-1970s when Matsumoku in Japan and St. Louis Music in Korea began marketing guitars under the brand. After production by Matsumoku ceased in 1991, the brand has occasionally been used on instruments by luthiers and guitar manufacturers in Europe and Asia.

History 
The first guitars to bear the Westone name were made by manufacturers in East Germany and Italy until 1975, when Japanese company Matsumoku acquired the rights to the Westone name, producing acoustic guitars and copies of some US models.

St. Louis Music registered the Westone mark in the United States in 1976 to market Matsumoku instruments in the country. They began importing the Westone-branded guitars to the United States as a replacement for their previous line of Custom Kraft–brand instruments manufactured for them by Kay and Valco since the mid-1950s.

Electra was also a brand of St. Louis Music. In 1984, they merged both brands to make the "Electra-Westone" brand, before dropping "Electra" from the name entirely from 1985 onwards. The majority of Westone guitars of the 1980s were made by the Matsumoku factory in Japan and imported by St. Louis Music. With Matsumoku ceasing operations in 1987, production was moved to Korea in 1988 and most of the innovative models disappeared. St. Louis Music replaced the Westone brand name by Alvarez in 1991.

Though initially popularized as inexpensive, entry-level guitars particularly useful for students, the transition to Asian manufacturing in the 80s brought a fundamental change in production, with designers emphasizing features such as custom pickups and electronics. Many Westone guitars and basses have since become collectors items.

In 1998, renowned luthier Sid Poole built some prestige guitars in England under the Westone name. Another revival of the brand came in 2010 when German company Musik-Meyer began producing Weston-branded copies of traditional instruments from other companies, such as the Fender Stratocaster, Fender Telecaster and Gibson Les Paul. In China, manufacturers have also commercialized copies of traditional US guitars with the Westone brand.

Models 

 Challenger
 Clipper Six
 Concord
 Corsair
 Dana
 Dimension
 Dynasty
 Genesis
 Paduak
 Pantera
 Phoenix
 Prestige
 Raider
 The Rail
 Rainbow
 Spectrum
 Thunder
 Villain

Users 
Notable musicians who have used Westone models includes:

Trevor Rabin (Rabbitt and Yes)
Tim Smith (Cardiacs)
Ian Masters (Pale Saints)
Leslie West (Mountain)
Kirk Pengilly (INXS)
Isaac Brock (Modest Mouse)
Gabriel Saloman (Yellow Swans)
Martin Kemp (Spandau Ballet) 
Dave Brock (Hawkwind)
Eric Brittingham (Cinderella)
Steve Lynch  ([Autograph])
Scott von Mehrens  (Von Mehrens)
Justin Broadrick (Napalm Death and Godflesh)
Cronos (Venom)
Mantas (Venom)
Varg Vikernes (Burzum)
Abbath (Immortal)
Morgan Håkansson (Marduk)

References

External links 

 Westone tribute website, with catalogue scans, repair information and up to date detailed model information

Guitar manufacturing companies
Musical instrument manufacturing companies of the United States